The Huangarua River is a river of the southern North Island of New Zealand. Rising in the foothills of the Aorangi Range it flows north to join the Ruamahanga River to the north of Martinborough.

See also
List of rivers of New Zealand

References

Rivers of the Wellington Region
Rivers of New Zealand